Dyschirius patruelis is a species of ground beetle in the subfamily Scaritinae. It was described by John Lawrence LeConte in 1852.

References

patruelis
Beetles described in 1852